Gong Cha is a tea drink franchise founded in 2006 in Kaohsiung, Taiwan.

Gong Cha expanded to Hong Kong in 2009, and by 2012 had further expanded internationally to Macau, South Korea, New Zealand, Australia, Malaysia, the United Kingdom, Canada, the United States, Mexico, the Philippines, Myanmar, Vietnam, Japan, Singapore, Brunei, Cambodia and China.

Name 
The name is a combination of the Chinese characters "", meaning contribution or tribute, and "", referring to tea. Together meaning "Tribute tea".

History 
Gong Cha, which translates to “tribute tea for the emperor,” was founded in 2006 in Kaohsiung, Taiwan. Gong Cha's first Hong Kong store was established in 2009 by a Hong Kong native who had lived in Taiwan for five years. In 2012 it had forty-six stores in Hong Kong, mainly in MTR stations and shopping centers, but that number has dropped to five due to decreased business from several health and safety scandals. Gong Cha serves a total of about fifty-seven different drinks, which can be divided into seven types: house specials, brewed tea, milk tea, 'Creative Mix,' coffee, 'Healthy Series,' and ice smoothies. These drinks are offered in medium and large sizes. Gong Cha also sells tea sets and tea in stores, such as Bi-Luo-Chun Green Tea and Darjeeling Spring Tea. In some locations they also offer food, a new recent addition being "Mochi Waffles".

In 2017, 70% of ownership was sold to Kim Yeo-jin, owner of Gong Cha Korea, Gong Cha's Korea franchisee, with backing from private equity firm Unison Capital. In January 2017, Gong Cha's main headquarters was acquired by Gong Cha Korea. CEO Kim Soo-Min has announced plans to reach out into the Middle East and Latin America, while promising to "change everything but the taste".

In 2019, TA Associates agreed to provide growth investment to Gong Cha and later bought 100% of Gong Cha Korea. UK company GC Group BIDCO Limited bought the remaining 30% in the same year, with GC Group BIDCO renamed to Gong Cha Global in 2020, moving the global headquarters to UK.

2011 Taiwan food scandal

In May 2011, a scandal broke out in Taiwan when many drinks were found to contain DEHP, a plasticiser which was added as a clouding agent in order to improve the appearance of the drinks. Ingestion of DEHP is known to cause heart problems and to affect male genital development. Even though Gong Cha's products were proved to contain no DEHP, the sales record of its branch in Causeway Bay dropped approximately 30%, caused by the news spread to Hong Kong. Gong Cha took a variety of actions to restore consumer confidence in the products, such as conducting tests on ingredients imported from Taiwan in order to prove their safety and in June 2011 discontinued certain kinds of juices in its Hong Kong branches before the test reports released. In the end, the products were proved to contain no DEHP.

Rebranding in Singapore
On May 29, 2017, it was announced that all 80+ Gong Cha stores will be closed and replaced with another brand, Liho.

However, Gong Cha's Singapore Branch announced its return on 1 December 2017.

See also
Bubble tea
Tea house
Tea culture

References

External links 
 
 Gong Cha Taiwan
 Gong Cha South Korea
 Gong Cha Singapore
 Gong Cha Australia
 Gong Cha Malaysia
 Gong Cha New York, USA
 Gong Cha California, USA
 Gong Cha Canada
Gong Cha Cambodia

Asian drinks
Restaurants established in 2006
Drink companies of South Korea
Bubble tea brands